Anne Emery is a Canadian writer of murder mystery novels. Emery has been awarded the 2019 Arthur Ellis Award for Best Novel, silver medal in the 2011 Independent Publisher Book Awards, and the 2007 Arthur Ellis Award for Best First Novel.

Emery, a lawyer from Halifax, Nova Scotia, graduated from St. Francis Xavier University and Dalhousie Law School. She has published ten novels in her Collins-Burke mystery series, which features Monty Collins, a Hallifax lawyer, and Father Brennan Burke, a Catholic priest and choirmaster.

Bibliography

Sign of the Cross (2006), 2007 Arthur Ellis Award for Best First Novel 
Obit (2007)
Barrington Street Blues (2008)
Cecilian Vespers (2009)
Children in the Morning (2010), silver medal winner in the 2011 Independent Publisher Book Awards; the title was inspired by Leonard Cohen's song "Suzanne"
Death at Christy Burke's (2011)
Blood on a Saint (2013), on short list for 2014 Atlantic Book Awards 
Ruined Abbey (2015)
Lament for Bonnie (2016)
Though the Heavens Fall (2018), 2019 Arthur Ellis Award for Best Crime Novel
Postmark Berlin (2020)
The Keening: A Mystery of Gaelic Ireland (2021)
Fenian Street (2022)

References

Living people
Canadian women novelists
Canadian mystery writers
Women mystery writers
21st-century Canadian novelists
21st-century Canadian women writers
1958 births